KUKE-LP (101.3 FM, "The Living Word Radio") is a radio station licensed to serve the community of Kula, Hawaii. The station is owned by Calvary Chapel Upcountry and airs a worship music format.

The station was assigned the KUKE-LP call letters by the Federal Communications Commission on August 7, 2014.

References

External links
 Official Website
 FCC Public Inspection File for KUKE-LP
 

UKE-LP
Radio stations established in 2015
2015 establishments in Hawaii
UKE-LP
Kula, Hawaii